Ansião is a municipality in Leiria District in Portugal. The population in 2011 was 13,128, in an area of 176.09 km².

The present Mayor is António José Domingues, elected by the Socialist Party. The municipal holiday is Ascension Day.

Parishes
Administratively, the municipality is divided into 6 civil parishes (freguesias):
 Alvorge
 Ansião (parish)
 Avelar
 Chão de Couce
 Pousaflores
 Santiago da Guarda

References

External links
 Municipality official website

Towns in Portugal
Populated places in Leiria District
Municipalities of Leiria District